Jorge Cáceres,  real name Luis Sergio Cáceres Toro (April 18, 1923 – September 21, 1949), was a Chilean poet, painter and dancer. He is discussed as a favorite of the Garmendia sisters in the Roberto Bolano novel Distant Star, in particular his work: Bound for the Great Polar Pyramid.

Works
René or celestial mechanics (1941)
Free Pass (1941)
Monument to the Birds (1942)
Bound for the Great Polar Pyramid (1942)
The frac incubator (1946)
Unpublished Texts (1979). Posthumous collection of Ludwig Zeller
Jorge Caceres, found poetry (2002). Collection of Guillermo Garcia, Pedro Montes, Mario Barrientos and Mauricio Artigas (Pentagram Editors).

References

Chilean male poets
Chilean male dancers
1923 births
1949 deaths
People from Santiago
20th-century Chilean painters
Chilean male artists
Chilean male painters
Male painters
20th-century Chilean male artists